An opcode table (also called an opcode matrix) is a visual representation of all opcodes in an instruction set. It is arranged such that each axis of the table represents an upper or lower nibble, which combined form the full byte of the opcode. Additional opcode tables can exist for additional instructions created using an opcode prefix.

Table values
The structure and arrangement of an opcode table appears as follows:

Each cell from 00-FF contains information about the operation such as the equivalent assembly instruction corresponding to the opcode, parameters, and CPU cycle counts.

External links
 Game Boy LR35902 opcode table
 Z80 opcode table
 Intel x86 opcode table
 6502/6510/8500/8502 opcode table

Machine code